St. Joseph University In Tanzania (SJUIT) is a  private university in Tanzania. This is run by Fr. Arul raj and family.

The university has campuses in multiple cities, although its main campus is at Mbezi, Dar es Salaam. The university has a College of Information Technology in Songea, a College of Agricultural Sciences and Technology (SJUCAST) in Songea, and a College of Management and Commerce (SJUCMC) in Makambako. Sr. I. Arockiamary is the Chancellor.

Its website states that the school offers bachelor's degrees in several disciplines, including multiples types of engineering (mechanical engineering, civil engineering, electrical engineering and electronic engineering, computer engineering), a degree in information systems and network engineering, one in management and commerce, as well as a doctor of medicine degree.

References

External links

 

Private universities in Tanzania
Universities in Dar es Salaam
Educational institutions established in 2011
2011 establishments in Tanzania